The 1910 Maryland Aggies football team was an American football team that represented Maryland Agricultural College (later part of the University of Maryland) in the 1910 college football season. The Aggies compiled a 4–3–1 record, shut out four of eight opponents, and outscored all opponents, 73 to 42. The team defeated Washington Central High School from the District of Columbia (12–0), the University of Richmond (20–0), Catholic University (21–0), and George Washington University (6–0), tied with Johns Hopkins (14–14), and lost its final three games against VMI (0–8), St. John's College (0–6), and Western Maryland (3–17). Royal Alston served as the team's head coach in his first and only season in that capacity.

Schedule

References

Maryland
Maryland Terrapins football seasons
Maryland Aggies football